Eriksholm Castle is a manor house located at the foot of the Isefjord inlet, 6 km south-east of Holbæk, in east Denmark. The history of the estate dates back to 1400 but today's house was built in 1788 to a Neoclassical design by Caspar Frederik Harsdorff, the leading Danish architect of the time. It was listed in the Danish registry of protected buildings and places in 1918.

History

Vinderup Manor
The estate traces its history back to 1400 when it was owned by Peder Jensen and known as Vinderup. It was crown land from 1536 to 1556 and again from 1573 to 1585.

Vasspyd, Pax and Juel, 1600–1752
In the year 1600 it was acquired by Erik Madsen Vasspyd who constructed a new main building and named it Eriksholm.

In 1682, the estate was acquired by Admiral Niels Iuel in exchange for Sæbygaard. He owned it until his death in 1697 and after that it remained in the possession of his descendants until 1752,

Seidelin Family, 1752–1824
 
The new owner was Hans Diderik de Brinck-Seidelin, the owner of nearby Hagestedgaard and Holbæk Ladegård. He created a stamhus (family trust) from his estates and was raised to the peerage under the name Brinck-Seidelin in 1753. His son, who was also named Hans Diderik de Brinck-Seidelin and inherited Eriksholm in 1778, commissioned the architect Caspar Frederik Harsdorff to design a new main building which was completed in 1788.

 
Brinck-Seidelin was hit by the financially difficult times for the large landowners and Eriksholm was in 1824 sold in public auction to Prime Minister Frederik Julius Falkenskiold Kaas (1758–1827).

Later history
In 1878, Frederik Ahlefeldt-Laurvig (1817–1889) bought Eriksholm and immediately passed it on to his son, later Minister of Foreign Affairs William Ahlefeldt-Laurvig. The estate has been in the possession of the Ahlefeldt-Laurvig family ever since.

Architecture
Designed in the Neoclassical style, Eriksholm is built in white-washed brick and consists of three wings under a black-glazed tile roof. The semicircular buildings which connect the main wings to the lower and short lateral wings are typical of the contemporary English Palladianism. The window frames and portals are made of sandstone from Bornholm.

Eriksholm today
The estate covers 335 hectares of farmland and 331 hectares of forest (1995). The main building is rented out for weddings, meetings and other events.

List of owners
 (      –      ) Peder Jensen
 (1400–      ) Forskellige ejere
 (      –1556) The Crown
 (1556–      ) Johan Friis
 (      –1573) Bjørn Andersen Bjørn
 (1573–1583) Kronen
 (1583–1600) Mads Eriksen Vasspyd
 (1600–1615) Erik Madsen Vasspyd
 (1615–1625) Karen Christoffersdatter Pax, gift Vasspyd
 (1625–1650) Christoffer Mogensen Pax
 (1650–1682) Holger Christoffersen Pax
 (1682–1697) Niels Juel
 (1697–1702) Margrethe Ulfeldt, gift Juel
 (1702–1731) Gregers Juel
 (1731–1752) Peder Gregersen Juel
 (1752–1778) Hans Diderik de Brinck-Seidelin
 (1778–1824) Hans Diderik Hansen de Brinck-Seidelin
 (1824–1825) Frederik Julius Falkenskiold Kaas
 (1825–1849) Hans Caspar Jacobsen
 (1849–1857) Christine Frederikke Petronelle Hansen, gift Jacobsen
 (1857–1872) Christian Frederik von Holstein
 (1872–1878) Engelbrethine Marie, gift von Holstein
 (1878)      Frederik Ahlefeldt-Laurvig
 (1878–1923) Carl William Ahlefeldt Laurvig
 (1923–1936) Elisabeth Danneskiold-Samsøe, gift Ahlefeldt-Laurvig
 (1936–1972) Kai Frederik Sophus Ahlefeldt-Laurvig
 (1959–1972) Kai Frederik Sophus Ahlefeldt-Laurvig
 (1972–2014) Christian William Ahlefeldt-Laurvig
 (2014–    ) JulRas Aps

References

External links

 Official website

Manor houses in Holbæk Municipality
Caspar Frederik Harsdorff buildings
Neoclassical architecture in Denmark
Houses completed in 1788
Listed buildings and structures in Holbæk Municipality
1788 establishments in Denmark
Buildings and structures associated with the Ahlefeldt family